The Strâmba (meaning "Worming Creek") is a right tributary of the river Mureș in Transylvania, Romania. It discharges into the Mureș in Suseni.

References

Rivers of Romania
Rivers of Harghita County